The following is an incomplete list of colleges and universities in Philadelphia and the surrounding area.

Philadelphia

Two-year colleges and technical schools
 Community College of Philadelphia
 Delaware Valley Academy of Medical and Dental Assistants
 Esperanza College of Eastern University
 Hussian School of Art
 Lincoln Technical Institute, Center City and Northeast Philadelphia
 Orleans Technical Institute
 Pennsylvania Institute of Technology, Center City and Media
 Star Technical Institute
 Talmudical Yeshiva of Philadelphia
 Thompson Institute
 WFI City College

Four-year colleges and universities

Public Institutions 

Temple University

 Lincoln University

Private Institutions 

Chestnut Hill College
The Curtis Institute of Music
Devry University, Center City
Drexel University
Holy Family University
La Salle University
Moore College of Art and Design
Peirce College
Pennsylvania Academy of the Fine Arts
The Restaurant School at Walnut Hill College
Saint Joseph's University
Strayer University, Center City Campus
Thomas Jefferson University
University of the Arts
University of Pennsylvania

Graduate institutions

Public Institutions 

 Temple University School of Podiatric Medicine

Private Institutions 

The Lutheran Theological Seminary at Philadelphia
Philadelphia College of Osteopathic Medicine
The Reconstructionist Rabbinical College
Westminster Theological Seminary

Delaware Valley

Two-year colleges and technical schools
 Antonelli Institute, Erdenheim
 Atlantic Cape Community College, Mays Landing, Atlantic City, and Cape May Court House, New Jersey
 Bucks County Community College, Newtown, Bristol and Perkasie
 Community College opf Philadelphia, ]
 Camden County College, Blackwood, Camden and Cherry Hill, New Jersey
 Cumberland County College, Vineland, New Jersey
 Delaware County Community College, Marple Township, Downingtown, Exton, Phoenixville, Sharon Hill, Upper Darby and West Grove
 Delaware Technical Community College, Wilmington, Delaware
 Goldey-Beacom College, Wilmington, Delaware
 Harcum College, Bryn Mawr
 Montgomery County Community College, Blue Bell and Pottstown
 Rowan College at Burlington County (formerly Burlington County College), Mt. Laurel, New Jersey, and Pemberton, New Jersey
 Rowan College of South Jersey, Sewell, New Jersey
 Salem Community College, Carneys Point, New Jersey
 Williamson Free School of Mechanical Trades, Media

Four-year colleges and universities

Public Institutions 

 Cheyney University, Cheyney
 Lincoln University, near Oxford

Penn State Abington, Abington
Penn State Brandywine, Media
Rowan University, Glassboro, New Jersey
Rutgers University–Camden, Camden, New Jersey
Stockton University, Pomona, New Jersey
Temple University Ambler, Ambler
West Chester University, West Chester

Private Institutions 

Arcadia University, Glenside
Bryn Athyn College, Bryn Athyn
Bryn Mawr College, Bryn Mawr
Cabrini University, Wayne
Cairn University, Langhorne
Delaware Valley University, Doylestown
Eastern University,   St. Davids
Goldey-Beacom College, Wilmington, Delaware
Gwynedd Mercy University, Lower Gwynedd Township
Gratz College, Elkins Park
Haverford College, Haverford
Immaculata University, Malvern
Manor College, Jenkintown
Neumann University, Aston
Rosemont College, Rosemont
St. Charles Borromeo Seminary, Wynnewood
Strayer University, Bensalem
Swarthmore College, Swarthmore
Ursinus College, Collegeville
University of Valley Forge, Phoenixville
Villanova University, Villanova
Widener University, Chester
Wilmington University, New Castle, Delaware

Hybrid Institutions 

 University of Delaware, Newark, Delaware

Graduate institutions

Public Institutions 

 Cooper Medical School of Rowan University, Camden, New Jersey
 Penn State Great Valley School of Graduate Professional Studies, Malvern
 Rowan-Virtua School of Osteopathic Medicine, Stratford, New Jersey
 Rutgers Law School, Camden, New Jersey

Private Institutions 

 Delaware Valley University, Doylestown
Palmer Theological Seminary, King of Prussia
St. Charles Borromeo Seminary Graduate School of Theology, Wynnewood
Salus University, Elkins Park
Villanova University Charles Widger School of Law, Villanova
Won Institute of Graduate Studies, Glenside

Former institutions
Philadelphia University
Spring Garden College
University of the Sciences

 
Philadelphia, List of colleges and universities in
Colleges
Colleges